Crow Lake may refer to:

Geography
 Crow Lake Township, Minnesota
 Crow Lake, South Dakota
 Crow Lake Township, South Dakota
 Crow Lake (Alaska)
 Crow Lake (Arkansas)
 Crow Lake (Idaho)
 Crow Lake (Alger County, Michigan)
 Crow Lake (Mackinac County, Michigan)
 Crow Lake (Cook County, Minnesota)
 Crow Lake (Stearns County, Minnesota)
 Crow Lake (Montana)
 Crow Lake (New Mexico)
 Crow Lake (Barnes County, North Dakota)
 Crow Lake (Dickey County, North Dakota)
 Crow Lake (Rolette County, North Dakota)
 Crow Lake (South Dakota)
 Crow Lake (Okanogan County, Washington)
 Crow Lake (Yakima County, Washington)
 Crow Lake (Wisconsin)
 Kakagi Lake, a lake in Ontario also known as Crow Lake

Other uses
 Crow Lake (novel), novel by Mary Lawson